= My Nemesis (novel) =

2023 novel by Charmaine Craig

- Author: Charmaine Craig
- Language: English
- Genre: Fiction
- Publisher: Grove Press
- Publication date: 2023

My Nemesis is a 2023 novel by American writer Charmaine Craig.

== Plot ==
Tessa is a successful writer who develops a friendship with Charlie, a philosopher and scholar. They begin to frequently meet and discuss philosophy.

Tessa’s husband Milton enjoys Charlie’s company, but Charlie’s wife Wah dislikes Tessa. Wah’s traditional femininity and subservience to her husband appear to Tessa as weaknesses, and she scoffs at the sacrifices Wah makes as adoptive mother to a once homeless girl named Htet. The two women frequently bicker, leading to a large fight.

Tessa reckons with her views, particularly that of her relationship with Wah. This begins a new path in her life of self discovery and new types of introspection.

== Writing and composition ==
Craig did not create an outline to write the book, but while writing did aim to produce a work of approximately 50,000 words. After selling the book, Craig removed some 3000 words from the work.

== Reception ==
Writing in the Boston Globe, critic Carolyn Kellogg called it “a breakthrough tour de force,” adding, “Many have tried to give us an unreliable narrator; few have succeeded as well as Craig does.” Kirkus and Publishers Weekly both published reviews. In a review published by the Star Tribune, Marion Winik praised the novel as a "spiky little feminist page-turner". The New York Times and The Wall Street Journal both criticized the narrative.
